Metarctia quinta is a moth of the subfamily Arctiinae. It was described by Sergius G. Kiriakoff in 1973. It is found in Zimbabwe.

References

Endemic fauna of Zimbabwe
Metarctia
Moths described in 1973
Lepidoptera of Zimbabwe
Moths of Sub-Saharan Africa